Orne (and its variant Örne) is a surname of Anglo-Saxon origin. It is derived from occupations and referred to a person who produced objects out of horn or musical instruments and also, a person who worked as a hornblower. It may also be related to the personal name Horn and to those who lived in the places, including Rutland, Somerset, or Surrey. The surname was also cited as originated from Norse origin.

Notable people with the surname include.

Anders Örne (1881–1956), Swedish politician
Azor Orne (1731–1796), American merchant and politician
Martin Theodore Orne (1927–2000), American psychologist and scholar
Sarah Orne Jewett (1849–1909), American novelist

References

Surnames of English origin